The Rawka River is a river in central Poland, a right tributary of the Bzura river (which it meets between Łowicz and Sochaczew), with a length of 97 kilometres and the basin area of 1,192 km2.

Rivers of Poland
Rivers of Łódź Voivodeship
Rivers of Masovian Voivodeship